Jose Oyarzabal may refer to:
José Ramón Oyarzábal born 1957, Spanish rower
José Oyarzabal (French rower) born 1970, French rower